Specklinia wrightii is a species of orchid plant native to Cuba.

References 

wrightii
Flora of Cuba
Plants described in 2004
Flora without expected TNC conservation status